is a Japanese actress, voice actress and singer from Kanagawa Prefecture. She debuted as a solo singer under the Flying Dog record label.

Biography
Sumire Morohoshi was born in Kanagawa Prefecture, Japan, in 1999. At the time of birth, the right side of her body was paralysed, but the paralysis was cured within a few months.

Morohoshi joined the Himawari Theatre Group at the age of three, inspired by her admiration for characters in Spirited Away. In 2006, at the age of seven, she voiced Carrie in the anime series Red Garden and was shocked by the vocal performance of co-star Takehito Koyasu. At the age of nine, she voiced Nina Tucker in Fullmetal Alchemist: Brotherhood, in which her "skillful" performance encouraged the staff to cast her as Betty in Heroman.

Since 2009, she has been active as a voice actor, in addition to performing in television dramas and on stage. In 2019, she made her debut in record label FlyingDog's track "Pure White," which was used for the opening theme to Ascendance of a Bookworm, and released as part of her debut album Smile. The second season featured Morohoshi's first solo single, "Tsumujikaze."

On July 14, 2022, Morohoshi tested positive for COVID-19.

Filmography

Television animation

Original video animation

Theatrical animation

Video games

Dubbing

Live-action
 2012, Lilly Curtis (Morgan Lily)
 Bedtime Stories, Bobbi Bronson (Laura Ann Kesling)
 Brothers, Isabelle Cahill (Bailee Madison)
 The Curious Case of Benjamin Button, Daisy Fuller (age 7) (Elle Fanning)
 Dark Shadows, Victoria Winters (young) (Alexia Osborne)
 The Fall, Alexandria (Catinca Untaru)
 Harper's Island, Abby Mills (young (Ava Hughes))
 Harry Potter and the Deathly Hallows – Part 2, Petunia Dursley (young (Ariella Paradise))
 Inception (theatrical version), Phillipa Cobb (age 5 (Taylor Geare))
 Interstellar, Murphy "Murph" Cooper (young) (Mackenzie Foy)
 The Mustang, Martha Coleman (Gideon Adlon)
 Nanny McPhee, Agatha "Aggie" Brown (Hebe Barnes, Zinnia Barnes)
 Old Dogs, Emily Greer (Ella Bleu Travolta)
 Percy Jackson: Sea of Monsters, Thalia Grace (young) (Katelyn Mager)
 The Sound of Music (2011 TV Tokyo edition), Marta von Trapp (Debbie Turner)
 Spider-Man 3, Penny Marko (Perla Haney-Jardine))
 Spy Kids: All the Time in the World, Rebecca Wilson (Rowan Blanchard)
 War, Ana Chang (Kennedy Lauren Montano)
 Without a Trace, Samantha Spade (young (Aspen Payge))

Animation
 Adventure Time: Distant Lands, Y5
 Bambi II, Thumper's Sister
 A Christmas Carol, Belle
 The Croods, Sandy Crood
 Frozen, Anna (age 9)
 Hawaiian Vacation, Bonnie Anderson
 Legend of the Guardians: The Owls of Ga'Hoole, Eglantine
 Leroy & Stitch, Lilo Pelekai
 Monster House, Eliza
 Partysaurus Rex, Bonnie Anderson, Cuddles the Alligator
 The Princess and the Frog, Charlotte "Lottie" La Bouff (young)
 Secrets of the Furious Five, Nerdy Bunny
 Small Fry, Bonnie Anderson
 Surf's Up, Kate
 Tangled, Rapunzel (young)
 Toy Story 3, Bonnie Anderson
 Toy Story of Terror!, Bonnie Anderson
 Wreck-It Ralph, Vanellope von Schweetz
 Ralph Breaks the Internet, Vanellope von Schweetz

Discography

References

External links
 

1999 births
Living people
Anime singers
Aoyama Gakuin University alumni
Japanese child actresses
Japanese women pop singers
Japanese video game actresses
Japanese voice actresses
Voice actresses from Kanagawa Prefecture
21st-century Japanese actresses
21st-century Japanese singers
21st-century Japanese women singers